Liadytiscus is an extinct genus of predaceous diving beetles in the family Dytiscidae. There are at least three described species in Liadytiscus.

Species
These three species belong to the genus Liadytiscus:
 † Liadytiscus cretaceus Prokin & Ren, 2010
 † Liadytiscus latus Prokin & Ren, 2010
 † Liadytiscus longitibialis Prokin & Ren, 2010

References

Dytiscidae
Prehistoric insect genera